Abdalqadir as-Sufi (born Ian Stewart Dallas; 1930 – 1 August 2021) was a Shaykh of Instruction, leader of the Darqawi-Shadhili-Qadiri Tariqa, founder of the Murabitun World Movement and author of numerous books on Islam, Sufism and political theory. Born in Scotland, he was a playwright and actor before he converted to Islam in 1967 with the Imam of the Qarawiyyin Mosque in Fez, Morocco.

Early life

Ian Dallas was born in Scotland in 1930 of a Highland family. He is a descendent of the literary critic and writer ES Dallas. He travelled extensively to Greece, France and Italy. In 1963 he acted in Federico Fellini's film 8½ as "Il partner della telepata".

Conversion
As-Sufi converted to Islam in 1967 in Fes, Morocco as Abdalqadir, witnessed by Abdalkarim Daudi, the Imam Khatib of the Qarawiyyin Mosque, and Alal al-Fasi. He then joined the Darqawi order as a student of Muhammad ibn al-Habib. He travelled to Morocco and Algeria with his Shaykh and was further instructed in Sufism by Sidi Hamud ibn al-Bashir of Blida and Sidi Fudul al-Huwari as-Sufi of Fes.

Teaching
Abdalqadir as-Sufi advocated adherence to the original legal school of Islam, the tradition of the people of Medina as recorded by Malik ibn Anas, since he considered this the primal formulation of Islamic society and a necessity for the re-establishment of Islam in the current age.

Abdalqadir was responsible for the establishment of the Ihsan Mosque in Norwich, Norfolk, England, the Great Mosque of Granada, and the Jumu'a Mosque of Cape Town

Abdalqadir as-Sufi taught that suicide terrorism is forbidden under Islamic law, that its psychological pattern stems from nihilism, and that it "draws attention away from the fact that capitalism has failed." 
He has stated that Britain is on "the edge of terminal decline" and that only Britain's Muslim population can "revitalise this ancient realm". He wrote extensively on the importance of monarchy and personal rule. He regarded the face veil (or niqab) of Muslim women as unislamic, describing it as an "evil hinduisation of women".

In 2006, he issued a fatwa, following a visit and speech given by then Pope Benedict XVI in Germany. In his Fatwa Concerning the Deliberations of Pope Benedict XVI in Germany, he stated that "in my opinion, Pope Benedict XVI is guilty of insulting the Messenger of Allah". He was an early mentor of American Sufi scholar, Hamza Yusuf.

Murabitun World Movement
In February 2014 he distanced himself from the dinar and dirham movement, saying, "So, I now dis-associate myself from all activity involving the Islamic gold dinar and silver dirham". The other major condition of a correct Zakat, he argued, is the existence of personal rule, or Amirate, since Zakat is, by Qur'anic injunction, accepted rulings and established practice, taken by the leader, not given as a voluntary sadaqa.

Death
As-Sufi died on 1 August 2021 in Cape Town, South Africa at the age of 91.

Authorship
The author of more than 20 books and several essays and articles, his books include:

The Book of Strangers, (State Univ of New York Press, 1972)
The Way of Muhammad, an existential exposition of the pillars of Islam from the perspective of Sufism (Diwan Press, 1975)
Indications From Signs, (Diwan Press, June 1980)
The Hundred Steps, a classic work on key steps in the path of Sufism (Portobello Press)
Qur'anic Tawhid, (Diwan Press, 1981)
Letter to An African Muslim, (Diwan Press, 1981)
Kufr – An Islamic Critique, (Diwan Press, 1982, ASIN: B0007C6U32)
Root Islamic Education, written on the school of the people of Madinah under the leadership of Imam Malik (Madinah Press, June 1993)
Oedipus and Dionysus (Freiburg Verlag, 1992)
The Sign of the Sword, an examination on the judgements on jihād in the light of classical works of fiqh, particularly al-Qawanin al-fiqhiyyah of Ibn Juzayy al-Kalbi, relating it to the contemporary situation and the global dominance of world banking and usury finance. (Diwan Press, 1984)
The Return of the Khalifate, a historical work on the Ottomans, their demise and its causes and an exposition of a route to the recovery of the khalifate (Madinah Press, 1996)
The Technique of the Coup de Banque on the modern age since its inception in the French Revolution. (Kutubia Mayurqa, 2000)
The New Wagnerian (Budgate Press, 2001)
Letter to an Arab Muslim (Editorial Kutubia Mayorqa, 2001)
Sultaniyya is a modern statement on leadership in Islam. Abdalqadir surveys Islam under the chapter headings Deen, Dawla (polity), Waqf, Trade, the Sultan – personal rule – and Tasawwuf. (Madinah Press, Cape Town, 2002, OCLC: 50875888)
Commentary on Surat al-Waqi’a (Madinah Press, 2004)
Collected Works (Budgate Press, 2005)
The Book of Tawhid (Madinah Press, 2006)
The Time of the Bedouin (Budgate Press, 2007)
The Book of Hubb (Madinah Press, 2007)
The Book of 'Amal (Madinah Press, 2008)
The Book of Safar (Madinah Press, 2009)
Political Renewal (The End of the Political Class/The House of Commons and Monarchy) (Budgate Press, 2009)
The Muslim Prince (Madinah Press, 2009)
The Interim is Mine (Budgate Press, 2010)
Three Plays (Budgate Press, 2010)
Ten Symphonies of Gorka König (Budgate Press, 2010)
Discourses (Madinah Press, 2010)
The Engines of the Broken World (Budgate Press, 2012)
Commentaries (Madinah Press, 2012)

Translations undertaken by his students

 The Noble Qur'an: a New Rendering of its Meanings in English, by Abdalhaqq and Aisha Bewley (Bookwork, Norwich, UK)
 The Muwatta of Imam Malik translated by Aisha Bewley and Ya'qub Johnson (Bookwork, Norwich, UK, 2001)
 Ash-Shifa by Qadi Iyad (published as Muhammad – Messenger of Allah) translated by Aisha Bewley (Madinah Press, 1992)
 The Letters of Shaykh Moulay Muhammad al-Arabi al-Darqawi (published as The Darqawi Way) translated by Aisha Bewley (Diwan Press Norwich, UK, 1980).
 The Foundations of Islam by Qadi 'Iyad.
The Seals of Wisdom by Muhyiddin ibn al-Arabi translated by Aisha Bewley (Madinah Press, Cape Town 2005)
Sufis and Sufism: A Defence by 'Abdu'l-Hayy al-'Amrawi and Abdu'l-Karim Murad translated by Aisha Bewley (Madinah Press, Cape Town 2004)
A Madinan View: on the Sunnah, courtesy, wisdom, battles and history  by Ibn Abi Zayd al-Qayrawani translated by Abdassamad Clarke (Ta-Ha Publishers Ltd, London 1999)

Gallery

Notes

References
 The Collected Works by Ian Dallas, Budgate Press, 2005,

External links
 Abdalqadir as-Sufi's Official Website
 Dallas College

1930 births
2021 deaths
20th-century Muslim scholars of Islam
British Sufi religious leaders
Sunni Sufis
Darqawi
Date of birth missing
Converts to Sunni Islam
People from Ayr
Scottish Sufis
Scottish philosophers
Scottish political writers
Scottish religious writers
Scottish spiritual writers
Sufism in Africa
Moroccan Sufis
South African Sufis